Garland Anderson (April 10, 1933 Union City, Ohio – 2001) was an American composer and pianist. He studied with Hans Gal and Roy Harris. In 1976 he was awarded a grant by the National Endowment for the Arts's Composer Assistance Program. This grant enabled Anderson to work on his opera Soyazhe which was given its world premiere at the Central City Opera in Denver in 1979. He lived most of his life in Indiana and is chiefly remembered for his jazz and ragtime compositions, in particular his work Streetsyncs: Eleven Ragtime Pieces for Piano. He composed his Piano Concerto No. 2 for concert pianist John Kozar who has performed the work on a number of occasions.

References 

1933 births
2001 deaths
20th-century American pianists
20th-century classical composers
20th-century classical pianists
American classical composers
American classical pianists
Male classical pianists
American male pianists
American male classical composers
American opera composers
Male opera composers
People from Union City, Ohio
20th-century American composers
Classical musicians from Ohio
20th-century American male musicians